Goniofusus strigatus is a species of sea snail, a marine gastropod mollusk in the family Fasciolariidae, the spindle snails, the tulip snails and their allies.

Description

Distribution

References

 Vermeij G.J. & Snyder M.A. (2018). Proposed genus-level classification of large species of Fusininae (Gastropoda, Fasciolariidae). Basteria. 82(4-6): 57-82.

External links
 Philippi, R. A. (1847-1851). Abbildungen und Beschreibungen neuer oder wenig gekannter Conchylien. Dritter Band. Cassel: Fischer. 1-138, pls 1-24

strigatus
Gastropods described in 1850
Taxa named by Rodolfo Amando Philippi